Everett Lane Weaver (1901 - 1971) was a Canadian politician, who served on Toronto City Council and in the Legislative Assembly of Ontario.

A lawyer, he was first elected to city council in the 1947 municipal election, and served for three years as councillor for Ward 2 (Cabbagetown and Rosedale). He was elected to the provincial legislature in the 1951 election, representing the district of St. David as a member of the Ontario Progressive Conservative Party. He served until 1955, and did not stand for re-election in the 1955 election.

He returned to his work as a lawyer, and was appointed as a county court judge in 1958. As a judge, he was most noted for his ruling in a 1964 trial that the novel Fanny Hill was obscene under the Criminal Code.

He died in 1971.

References

External links 
 

1901 births
1971 deaths
Toronto city councillors
Progressive Conservative Party of Ontario MPPs
Judges in Ontario
Lawyers in Ontario
People from Cambridge, Ontario